Igualita a mí is a 2022 Peruvian comedy film directed by Felipe Martínez Amador and written by Juan Vera, Daniel Cuparo & Mariano Vera. It is a remake of the 2010 Argentine film Igualita a mí. It stars Carlos Alcántara and Daniela Camaiora. It premiered on June 16, 2022, in Peruvian theaters.

Synopsis 
Fredy, a 48-year-old bachelor with no children, who continues to live as if he were a teenager... He loves staying up all night, he thinks he's a kid, and he's an eternal seducer of thirty-somethings. One night he meets Aylín, a 30-year-old girl, who arrives in Lima, and surprises him that she thinks she is his daughter. After the DNA test, the result confirms, not only that he is her father, but that Aylín is pregnant by her ex-boyfriend. Father and future grandfather overnight! Fredy's life takes a 180 degree turn when he least expected it. Will you be prepared for everything that comes?

Cast 
The actors participating in this film are:

 Carlos Alcántara as Fredy
 Daniela Camairoa as Aylín
 Andrea Luna
 Renato Rueda
 Anahí de Cardenas
 Maju Mantilla
 Malory Vargas
 Melissa Paredes
 Sonia Seminario

Production 
Principal photography began at the end of October 2019 and lasted for 5 weeks in total.

Release 
Igualita a mí was scheduled to premiere in August 2020 in Peruvian theaters, but it was canceled due to the covid-19 pandemic. Finally, it was released on June 16, 2022, in Peruvian theaters.

References

External links 

 

2022 films
2022 comedy films
Peruvian comedy films
Tondero Producciones films
2020s Spanish-language films
2020s Peruvian films
Films set in Peru
Films shot in Peru
Films about families
Films about father–daughter relationships
Remakes of Argentine films